Regina Wisniowiecka (also known as Mohilianka or Mohylianka; with her first name rendered as Raina or Irina) was a Polish noble lady originally from Moldavia. She was a wife of Michał Wiśniowiecki and patron of Eastern Orthodox Christianity in the Polish–Lithuanian Commonwealth.

She was a daughter of Moldavian hospodar Ieremia Movilă and Elisabeta Movilă and a cousin of Metropolitan of Kiev Peter Mohyla. Due to the conflict with Michael the Brave, 1600 Ieremia was forced to move his family to Galicia, according to the Polish Biographical Dictionary to town of Ustia (today it is a village of Ustia-Zelene in Chortkiv Raion).

At age 14 Regina married Polish magnate of Ruthenian origin Michał Wiśniowiecki in 1603 in the city of Suceava, Moldavia.

Family
Regina was married only to Michał Wiśniowiecki and had at least four children with him.
 Jeremi Wiśniowiecki (1612-1651)
 Alexander Wiśniowiecki (?-1629)
 Jerzy Wiśniowiecki (?-1629)
 Anna (?-1648), married Zbigniew Firlej

References

External links
  Muzychenko, Ya. Who betrayed Yarema?. Ukrayina Moloda.

1589 births
1619 deaths
People of the Principality of Moldavia
Regina